Gerald Thomas Tanner (24 August 1921 – 10 January 2022) was  an Australian rules footballer who played with Richmond in the Victorian Football League (VFL).

Family
The son of Aloysius Lindsay Walter Tanner (1890-1990), and Monica Amy Tanner (1895-1963), née Knight, Gerald Thomas Tanner was born at Wodonga, Victoria on 24 August 1921.

He married Margaret Raie Murphy (1928-2005) on 12 November 1949. He is the father of former North Melbourne and Melbourne player, Xavier Tanner.

Football
Tanner was originally from Wodonga, played with Cobram in 1939 and 1940. Tanner returned to Wodonga in 1945 and went onto play 120 games with Wodonga, including their 1949 O&MFL grand final loss to Albury.

Death
He turned 100 on 24 August 2021, and died at Wodonga, Victoria on 10 January 2022.

Notes

References
 Hogan P: The Tigers Of Old, Richmond FC, (Melbourne), 1996.

External links 
 		
 
 Gerald Tanner profile at Tigerland Archive
 1945 - Wodonga FC team photo
 1948 - Wodonga FC team photo
 1949 - Wodonga FC team photo
 1949 - Wodonga FC O&MFL grand final team photo
 100th Birthday photo

1921 births
2022 deaths
Men centenarians
Australian centenarians
Australian rules footballers from Victoria (Australia)
Richmond Football Club players
Wodonga Football Club players
People from Creswick, Victoria